Sincerely Yours in Cold Blood is a Finnish crime drama television series that aired on Nelonen from February 29, 2000 to November 29, 2005. All of its 30 episodes are based on true crime cases.

Cast 
 Ville Virtanen as Veli Miettinen
 Leena Uotila as Mailis Santala
 Antti Reini as T.T. Mikkonen
 Outi Mäenpää as Päivi Miettinen
 Meri Nenonen as Mira Kataja
 Esko Nikkari as a pathologist
 Kari Väänänen as Kalevi Repo

References

External links 
 

2000 Finnish television series debuts
2000s Finnish television series
2005 Finnish television series endings
2000s crime television series
Television shows set in Finland
Finnish drama television series
Finnish police procedural television series
Nelonen original programming